Wild Recon (Tuesdays at 9:00 pm Eastern/8:00 pm Central) is hosted by animal expert Donald Schultz. The show hosts many deadly animals such as: death adder, saltwater crocodile, lion and many other countless species that can take lives in an instant. Near the beginning of the show Donald states where he is, the main animals he's looking for, and then says "This is not a stunt; this is my job" and jumps out of the helicopter.  Schultz's mission is to extract venom and other rare attributes of some of the world's deadliest, most intriguing animals.  These samples are used to catalog information of lesser known species as well as research possible antidotes and medicinal uses.  The first episode aired on Tuesday, January 5, 2010 at 9 pm Eastern time on Animal Planet.

Episodes
A list of episodes of the first season of Wild Recon, as well as the area(s) Donald Schultz traveled to.

 Alien Invasion--- Australia
 Rampage---------- Sri Lanka
 Bounty Hunter---- Belize
 Border War------- South Africa
 Bitten----------- Australia
 Desert Venom----- Jordan
 Lost Worlds------ Tanzania, South Africa, Mozambique
 Hidden Cures----- Costa Rica
 Moving Target---- Swaziland
 Ocean Killers---- Bahamas, California, Florida

Special episode

"Venom in Vegas"

In this episode of Wild Recon, Donald Schultz lives in a clear box full of snakes for ten days.  Schultz starts with 50 snakes, and is continuously introduced to more at a pace of 5 per day.  Schultz is acquainted with species such as black mambas, rattlesnakes, and puff adders.  Appropriate precautions were taken so that in the event that Schultz was bitten, medics would be on the scene instantly.  During the ten days he is rooming with snakes, Donald extracts samples to learn more about the species.  He claims his mission is to show people that humans can live along with snakes, regardless of whether they are venomous or not.

Incidents
On the episode "Bitten" Donald is injected by a type of tree snake and his arm begins to swell, but he makes it on, and gets DNA samples from the elusive platypus.

External links

Animal Planet original programming
2010 American television series debuts